Salisbury City Football Club was an English football club based in Salisbury, Wiltshire. They were formed in 1947 and played at The Raymond McEnhill Stadium. Salisbury have gained back-to-back promotions in, first to the Conference South in the 2005–06 season by finishing top of the Southern League Premier Division, followed by winning the play-off final in the 2006–07 season to participate in the Conference Premier in 2007–08. They played the 2010–11 season in the Southern League Premier Division after being demoted from the Conference Premier at the end of the 2009–10 season, but won promotion to the Conference South for the 2011–12 season in the first season following their demotion. The club spent two seasons in the Conference South before winning promotion to the Conference Premier via the play-offs in the 2012–13 season.

History

Key
Top scorer and number of goals scored shown in bold when he was also the top scorer for the division.

Key to league record
 Lvl = Level of the league in the current league system
 S = Numbers of seasons
 Pld = Games played
 W = Games won
 D = Games drawn
 L = Games lost
 GF = Goals for
 GA = Goals against
 GD = Goals difference
 Pts = Points
 Position = Position in the final league table
 Overall position = Overall club position in the English league system

Key to cup records
 Res = Final reached round
 Rec = Final club record in the form of wins-draws-losses
 PR = Premilinary round
 QR1 = Qualifying round 1
 QR2 = Qualifying round 2
 QR3 = Qualifying round 3
 QR4 = Qualifying round 4
 R1 = Round 1
 R2 = Round 2
 R3 = Round 3
 R4 = Round 4
 R5 = Round 5
 R6 = Round 6
 QF = Quarter-finals
 SF = Semi-finals
 RU = Runners-up
 W = Winners

 Average home attendance = for league games only

Seasons
Salisbury City seasons since their moving to Southern Football League in 1968.

* – 2 points for a win.
** – 3 points deducted.
*** – 1 point deducted for fielding an ineligible player.
† – demoted 2 divisions down after entering administration.
‡ – demoted from Conference due to financial irregularities.

References

English football club seasons